Ian Ritchie may refer to:

 Ian Ritchie (producer), composer, producer, arranger and saxophonist
 Ian Ritchie (architect) (born 1947), British architect
 Ian Ritchie Architects, his company
 Ian Ritchie (entrepreneur), Scottish businessman
 Ian Ritchie (baseball) (born c. 2004), American baseball player